Riverside Plantation Tabby Ruins is a historic archeological site located on Saint Helena Island near Frogmore, Beaufort County, South Carolina. The ruins are significant as an example of early- to mid-19th century tabby construction. The ruins are the remains of an outbuilding associated with the Riverside Plantation and have great archaeological potential.

It was listed in the National Register of Historic Places in 1988.

References

Archaeological sites on the National Register of Historic Places in South Carolina
Buildings and structures in Beaufort County, South Carolina
National Register of Historic Places in Beaufort County, South Carolina
Tabby buildings